Michael Callihan (born August 7, 1947) is an American Democratic politician who was the 42nd Lieutenant Governor of Colorado, serving from 1987 to 1994 under Roy Romer. He was an unsuccessful candidate for congress in 1992, losing to Republican Scott McInnis.

Personal information
Callihan was born in Spokane, Washington, on August 7, 1947.

Education
He graduated from Regis High School in Denver, Colorado, and obtained his degree from Western State College in Gunnison, Colorado.

Career
Callihan is a businessman and politician who served in the U.S. Navy. In 1974, Mike was elected Gunnison County Assessor. In 1978 he was elected to serve in the Colorado House of Representatives, and in 1982 he was elected to serve in the Colorado Senate.

Bills
Callihan introduced  bills in effort to the youth with their drug and alcohol addictions.

Family
Callihan is married to Debra McDonald Callihan.

References

1947 births
Living people
Politicians from Spokane, Washington
Western Colorado University alumni
20th-century American politicians
County assessors in the United States
Democratic Party members of the Colorado House of Representatives
Democratic Party Colorado state senators
Lieutenant Governors of Colorado